The 2019 Philadelphia Union season was the club's tenth season in Major League Soccer, the top flight of American soccer. The team was managed by Jim Curtin, his sixth season with the club. Building on the previous 2018 season, the Union won their first MLS Cup Playoff match in club history, in a comeback 4–3 win against New York Red Bulls. Additionally, the team set new records for points earned within a single season (55), wins (16), and goals scored (58).

Background

Roster

Transfers

In

Loan in

Out

Staff

Note: Dick Schreuder served as assistant coach through Week 17 and departed for TSG Hoffenheim after June 8.

Competitions

Preseason

MLS season

MLS Cup Playoffs

U.S. Open Cup

Friendlies

Standings

Eastern Conference

League standings

Results summary 

Position references Eastern Conference standings.

Statistics

Appearances and goals
Last updated October 20, 2019

|-
! colspan=14 style=background:#dcdcdc; text-align:center|Goalkeepers

|-
! colspan=14 style=background:#dcdcdc; text-align:center|Defenders

|-
! colspan=14 style=background:#dcdcdc; text-align:center|Midfielders

|-
! colspan=14 style=background:#dcdcdc; text-align:center|Forwards

|-
|}

Top scorers

Goalkeepers

Honors and awards

References

External links
 Official Website
 Philadelphia Union at ESPN FC

Philadelphia Union seasons
Philadelphia Union
Philadelphia Union
Philadelphia Union